Wawrzeńczyce may refer to the following places in Poland:
Wawrzeńczyce, Lower Silesian Voivodeship (south-west Poland)
Wawrzeńczyce, Lesser Poland Voivodeship (south Poland)
Wawrzeńczyce, Świętokrzyskie Voivodeship (south-central Poland)